Das Erste ("The First") is the flagship national television channel of the ARD association of public broadcasting corporations in Germany. Das Erste is jointly operated by the nine regional public broadcasting corporations that are members of the ARD.

The channel was officially launched on 25 December 1952 as NWDR-Fernsehen and renamed to Deutsches Fernsehen in 1954. Since 1996, the official brand is Das Erste; the full name Erstes Deutsches Fernsehen (First German Television) is still used before every major news edition. In colloquial speech, the station is usually called Erstes Programm ("First Channel"), or by its metonym, ARD.

History

The channel's first experimental broadcast was on 27 November 1950 as the TV channel of the then NWDR, which in 1956 split into NDR and WDR. The regular NWDR television service started on 25 December 1952. Nationwide transmission began on 1 November 1954 within the ARD framework, under the name Deutsches Fernsehen ("German Television"). It was West Germany's only television channel prior to the establishment of ZDF in 1963.

The new channel consisted of jointly-produced shows such as the nightly news programme Tagesschau (on the air since 26 December 1952), as well as broadcasts produced individually by ARD member stations. The programs were coordinated by the Programmdirektion based in Munich. Besides several entertaining shows, ARD went political in 1957 when it launched its first political TV magazine, Panorama. Germany's first political TV show adopted the slogan "What is being talked about and what should be talked about" and pictured all aspects of postwar West German society—including conflict-laden topics, scandals, and other taboo topics, such as former Nazis who had held important roles.

ARD nevertheless produced a provisional second TV channel from 1 June 1961 until ZDF started its transmissions on 1 April 1963. Colour television was introduced on 25 August 1967. Since 1 September 1995, Das Erste has broadcast 24 hours a day.

The channel's name was changed to Erstes Deutsches Fernsehen ("First German Television") on 1 October 1984. At the same time, a new corporate design was introduced, designed by Hans Bacher, along with new CGI idents produced by Cranston/Csuri Productions in Columbus, Ohio. The previous logo, with stylized waves, was replaced by a new logo showing a stylized number "1" which is still in use today. It changed its name to Das Erste on 1 January 1997, but the long name Erstes Deutsches Fernsehen is still used for some purposes (e.g. the introduction to the main editions of the Tagesschau). Informally, it is also known under the metonym ARD among viewers.

In addition to its SD broadcast, a 720p50 HD version of the channel, Das Erste HD, is also broadcast. Broadcast of Das Erste HD began in February 2010 with the coverage of the 2010 Winter Olympics in Vancouver, British Columbia, Canada. Das Erste HD is available via satellite (DVB-S2 on Astra 19.2°E), cable (all cable providers in Germany and some providers throughout Europe), IPTV (MagentaTV), encoded using H.264 AVC, and on digital terrestrial television in 1080p50, encoded using H.265 HEVC.

Member broadcasting organizations
All nine of Germany's regional public-broadcasting organizations contribute to the output of Das Erste and broadcast its programming in a common schedule.

Time assigned
Each regional member of ARD contributes programming to the channel's schedule in proportion to the population of the area it serves. , the time allocations as percentage shares of total broadcast hours were:

Broadcasting
Before 1990, Das Erste was only distributed in West Germany, and was almost exclusively broadcast using transmitters owned by the Deutsche Bundespost. However, the transmitters were powerful enough that Das Erste could easily be seen in nearly all of East Germany as well. Exceptions included Dresden, located in a deep valley in southeastern East Germany, and the area around Rügen. Indeed, Das Erste's broadcasts, particularly its newscasts, were far more popular in East Germany than those of state broadcaster Deutscher Fernsehfunk. One popular nickname for ARD in East Germany was Außer Rügen und Dresden (except Rügen and Dresden).

On 15 December 1990 following reunification, programming from ARD was distributed by Deutsche Post of the GDR for the first time. The GDR-transmitters were later taken over by the Bundespost and merged organizationally with the West German transmitters. The transmitters of the Bundespost were transferred to Deutsche Telekom in 1995, and then in turn to T-Systems in 2000.
 
Between 2002 and 2008 the transmission facilities in Germany were successively converted from the analogue terrestrial PAL standard to the new digital terrestrial DVB-T television standard.

Das Erste is available throughout Europe on free-to-air digital satellite television via Astra, as well as on many cable providers. Transmission via the Hot Bird satellite was stopped on 1 April 2017.

Logo history

Programmes

Children

Frag doch mal die Maus (WDR), hosted by Eckart von Hirschhausen (2006–present)
Janoschs Traumstunde, children's programme (1986—1998)
Sesamstraße (NDR), children's programme
Die Sendung mit der Maus (WDR), children's programme

Entertainment 

Alfons und Gäste (SWR/SR) (2008–present)
Die große Show der Naturwunder (SWR) (2006–present)
extra 3 (NDR), political satire
Gefragt - Gejagt, German version of The Chase (2015–present)
Immer wieder Sonntags (SWR) (1995–present)
Inas Nacht (NDR) (2009–present)
Musikantenstadl (co-production with ORF and SRF) (1983–2015)
 (NDR), hosted by Jörg Pilawa (2014–present)
 (WDR) (2016–present)
Spiel für dein Land - Das größte Quiz Europas (co-production with ORF and SRF), hosted by Jörg Pilawa (2015–present)
 (SDR/SWR), hosted by Guido Cantz (1980–2021)

Information 

ARD-Morgenmagazin (WDR) (1992–present)
ARD-Mittagsmagazin (RBB) (1989–present)
Berliner Runde (SFB/RBB) (1999–present)
Bonner Runde (WDR) (1972–1999)
Brennpunkt (multiple) (1971–present)
Brisant (MDR) (1994–present)
Fakt (MDR) (1992–present)
Kontraste (SFB/RBB) (1968–present)
Monitor (WDR) (1965–present)
 (ARD Aktuell, NDR) (1995–present)
Panorama (NDR) (1957–present)
Plusminus (multiple) (1975–present)
Presseclub (WDR) (1987–present)
Presseschau (SFB) (1969–2002)
Report (Report Mainz/Report München) (SWF/SWR/BR) (1960–present)
Tagesschau (ARD Aktuell, NWDR/NDR) (1952–present)
Tagesthemen (ARD Aktuell, NDR) (1978–present)
 (SFB/RBB/MDR) (1969–present)
Weltspiegel (multiple) (1963–present)

Series 

Babylon Berlin (2018–present)
Blankenese (1994, 2001–2002, 2005)
Charité (2017)
Die Stein (2008, 2011)
Earth 2 (2008)
Falcon Crest (1983–1991)
Frau Temme sucht das Glück (2017)
Großstadtrevier (1986–present)
Heiter bis tödlich (multiple), light police comedy
In aller Freundschaft (MDR), weekly soap (1998–present)
 (MDR), weekly soap (2015–present)
Kir Royal (1986–1990)
Lindenstraße (WDR), weekly soap (1985–2020)
Magnum, P.I. (Magnum) (1984–1994)
Miami Vice (1986–1994)
Mord in bester Gesellschaft crime series (2007–present)
Murder, She Wrote (Mord ist ihr Hobby) (1988)
Polizeiruf 110 (multiple), crime drama
Rentnercops (2015–present)
Rote Rosen (Degeto Film), daily soap (2006–present)
Sturm der Liebe (BR), daily soap (2005–present)
Tatort (all regional stations)
Türkisch für Anfänger (2006–2009)
Um Himmels Willen (2002–present)
Vorstadtweiber (2015–2016)
Weissensee (2010, 2013, 2015)

Sport 

Sportschau (on Saturdays with Bundesliga, WDR) (1961–present)
Sportschau vor acht (WDR) (2013–present)
Sportschau-Club (WDR) (2012–present)
 FIFA World Cup (1954-present)
 UEFA European Championship (1960-present)

Talk

Anne Will (NDR), hosted by Anne Will (2007–present)
Beckmann (NDR), hosted by Reinhold Beckmann (1999–2014)
Der internationale Frühschoppen (1953–1987)
Günther Jauch (NDR), hosted by Günther Jauch (2011–2015)
Hart aber fair (WDR), hosted by Frank Plasberg (2007–present)
Maischberger (RBB/WDR), hosted by Sandra Maischberger (2003–present)
Sabine Christiansen (NDR), hosted by Sabine Christiansen (1998–2007)

Former programmes

Beat-Club
Berlin, Berlin (SFB/RBB)
Echo Music Prize (1998–2000, 2009–2016)
Ein Herz und eine Seele (NDR)
Die Kommissarin (1994–2006)
Graf Yoster (1967–1976)
Harald Schmidt (WDR)
Marienhof (WDR), daily soap (1992–2009)
Musikladen
Polylux (ORB/RBB) (2000–2008)
Raumpatrouille
Verbotene Liebe (WDR), daily soap (1995–2015)
 (ARD-aktuell, NWDR/NDR) (1953–2014)
 (HR), (1965–2013)

Audience share

Germany

The average age of the viewers is 61 years.

References

External links

  
 DasErste Mediathek (VoD Portal) 

1952 establishments in West Germany
ARD (broadcaster)
Companies based in Munich
German-language television stations
Mass media in Munich
Television channels and stations established in 1952
Television stations in Germany